The Oklahoma City Dodgers are a Minor League Baseball team of the Pacific Coast League (PCL) and the Triple-A affiliate of the Los Angeles Dodgers. They are located in Oklahoma City, Oklahoma, and play their home games at Chickasaw Bricktown Ballpark, which opened in 1998 in the city's Bricktown district.

The team was originally known as the Oklahoma City 89ers from 1962 to 1997 and played at All Sports Stadium. The 89ers competed in the Triple-A American Association (AA) in 1962, moved to the Pacific Coast League from 1963 to 1968, and returned to the AA from 1969 to 1997. After the American Association disbanded, the 89ers rejoined the PCL in 1998. The team renamed itself the Oklahoma RedHawks from 1998 to 2008 and the Oklahoma City RedHawks from 2009 to 2014. The franchise affiliated with the Los Angeles Dodgers in 2015 and changed its name to the Oklahoma City Dodgers. 

Oklahoma City has won four league championships. The 89ers won the PCL championship in 1963 and 1965 as the Triple-A affiliate of the Houston Colt .45s/Astros. They later won the American Association championship in 1992 and 1996 with the Texas Rangers.

Oklahoma City Mets and Indians (1904–1957)
Oklahoma City has been home to professional baseball for all but a few years since 1904, when the Metropolitans (Mets) were established as the city's first team. Oklahoma City's teams and names have changed numerous times since. The team became known as the Indians in 1909 before returning to the original Mets name in 1910 and reverting again to the Indians name in 1911. Oklahoma City was home to the Senators in 1912. After one year without a baseball team, Oklahoma City's squad became the Boosters in 1914. The Senators name returned from 1915 to 1916, but the Boosters name came back in 1917. The Oklahoma City Indians name returned in 1918 and the team name stuck until 1957 (the team did not compete during World War II).

Oklahoma City 89ers (1962–1997)
Oklahoma City's current baseball franchise began competing in 1962 as the Oklahoma City 89ers following a four-year period without professional baseball in the area. The franchise's original name made reference to the Land Run of 1889, which led to the founding of Oklahoma City. 

After the Houston Buffaloes of the American Association were purchased for territorial rights by the Houston Colt .45s (later the Houston Astros) of the National League, the big league club decided to move the Buffs elsewhere. In July 1961, Spec Richardson, who was then general manager of the Buffs, met with Oklahoma City officials and boosters, and agreed to move the team. After a unanimous approval from the American Association's board of directors, the current franchise began play in 1962 as the top affiliate of the Houston Colt .45s. The 89ers won the PCL championship in 1963 and 1965. 

The Astros divested the team to Tulsa businessman, P. C. Dixon, in November 1970. The franchise affiliated with Cleveland from 1973 and 1975 and with the Philadelphia Phillies from 1976 until 1982. 

The Texas Rangers became the parent club in 1983. The 89ers won the American Association championship in 1992 and 1996 as an affiliate of the Rangers.

Oklahoma City RedHawks (1998–2014)
 The franchise moved to the new Chickasaw Bricktown Ballpark in 1998, returned to the PCL, and renamed the team the Oklahoma RedHawks. The team was renamed the RedHawks after the red-tailed hawk, a bird of prey commonly seen throughout Oklahoma. When announcing the new name, team officials noted the raptor's four-foot wingspan and migration patterns, which always return the bird to Oklahoma. A hawk is also part of the state's official song.

 Prior to the 2009 season, the team once again named itself after its home city. The minor renaming was accompanied by new logos and a new color scheme. The team's name change to the Oklahoma City RedHawks was made to honor Oklahoma City citizens who paid for the ballpark through a temporary one-cent sales tax to fund the Metropolitan Area Projects Plan or MAPS.

 Pitchers Dustin Nippert and Luis Mendoza recorded the two no-hitters in team history (since 1998). Nippert recorded the RedHawks' first no-hitter on June 29, 2008, at Johnny Rosenblatt Stadium in Omaha, Nebraska against the Omaha Royals. The Redhawks won the seven-inning game, the first of a doubleheader, 2–0. Nippert walked two batters and struck out five in the first Oklahoma City professional baseball no-hitter since August 13, 1996, when Rick Helling recorded a perfect game for the 89ers).

Mendoza pitched the team's first nine-inning no-hitter on August 14, 2009, against the Salt Lake Bees at Bricktown Ballpark. He threw 125 pitches, including 74 for strikes. He walked six and struck out six batters in the 5–0 win.

Six players have hit three home runs in a single game. Adrián González became the first to accomplish the offensive feat on May 24, 2005, at Albuquerque. He went 3-for-4 with five RBI. All three of Nelson Cruz's hits on July 19, 2008, against Memphis were home runs. He went 3-for-5 with five RBI in the game. Nate Gold went 4-for-5 with three homers and four RBI on July 28, 2008, at Colorado Springs. Chad Tracy hit three homers on June 27, 2010, against Omaha, finishing the game 3-for-3 with five RBI. Mike Hessman went 4-for-4 with three homers on June 3, 2012, against Iowa. Matt Duffy went 3-for-4 with three homers and three RBI on June 9, 2014, against Salt Lake.

Gregorio Petit is the lone OKC player to record two grand slams in one game, accomplishing the feat June 22, 2010 at New Orleans.

On September 14, 2010, the Texas Rangers ownership announced that they were moving their Triple-A affiliation to the Round Rock Express (formerly the Astros' Triple-A affiliate). On September 15, the RedHawks were sold to Mandalay Baseball Properties, which also owns or operates four other Minor League Baseball teams, and is part of the Mandalay Entertainment conglomerate chaired by entertainment industry executive Peter Guber. On September 20, Mandalay entered into a formal agreement for the RedHawks to become the Astros' new Triple-A affiliate.

Anderson Hernandez put together the longest hitting streak in team history August 2 – September 2, 2011 – a streak that lasted 30 games.

The 2013 Redhawks made numerous entries into the club's record book. The RedHawks set the team record for most runs scored in a game at Chickasaw Bricktown Ballpark and tied the club record for most runs scored in a game overall in a 24–5 win against Colorado Springs on August 3, 2013.

The 2013 squad also compiled the longest overall and home winning streaks in club history. The RedHawks won 12 straight games overall from July 26 to August 6. They continued winning at home, stringing together 17 consecutive wins at Chickasaw Bricktown Ballpark from July 26 to August 20.

Oklahoma City Dodgers (2015–present)
After the 2014 season, the RedHawks announced the sale of the franchise to a partnership between Mandalay Entertainment Chairman and CEO Peter Guber, other current principals of Mandalay Baseball Properties, Jason Sugarman, and the Los Angeles Dodgers. As a result of the purchase agreement, the RedHawks became the Triple-A affiliate of the Dodgers in 2015 and were renamed after their parent club, becoming the Oklahoma City Dodgers. 

The 2015 OKC Dodgers set a new modern-era mark for wins, finishing the regular season with the best record in the PCL at 86-58 and going on to win the American Northern Division title. The last OKC team to win at least 86 games was the 1965 Oklahoma City 89ers (91-54). The 2015 team also set single-season team records for road wins (44), fewest runs allowed (608), and fewest home runs allowed (89). The team stood 30 games above .500 (85-55) during the season, the first time the team reached that mark in its modern PCL history. OKC Dodgers manager Damon Berryhill was named 2015 PCL Manager of the Year, becoming the first OKC manager to win the honor since Greg Biagini in 1999.

Corey Seager became the second OKC player in the PCL era to record six hits in a game when he went 6-for-6 in Salt Lake May 28, 2015, including a home run and two doubles. Seager collected six RBI and scored two runs. Jeff Pickler was the first OKC player in the modern era to accomplish the feat June 22, 2004, at Albuquerque, going 6-for-6 with a double, triple, and RBI.

The 2016 OKC Dodgers claimed a second straight 80-win regular season and picked up back-to-back PCL American Northern Division championships. They advanced to the PCL Championship Series for the first time since 2008.

The 2016 Dodgers posted a 3.72 team ERA to establish a new club record during the PCL era and the OKC pitching staff racked up a league-leading 1,245 strikeouts to set the PCL modern era record for strikeouts in just 141 games. The Dodgers allowed a league-low 372 walks, also the fewest allowed by an OKC team during the PCL era. Pitcher Jose De Leon became the first OKC pitcher to record five double-digit strikeout games in one season.

The record-breaking continued for the OKC Dodgers in 2017. The team broke its own record for strikeouts as Dodgers pitchers combined for 1,277 strikeouts during the season.

Right-handed starting pitcher Wilmer Font led the charge and paced all of Triple-A baseball with 178 strikeouts and set OKC's all-time single-season strikeout record (since 1998). He tied former Dodger Jose De Leon's club record by compiling five games with at least 10 strikeouts. Font racked up a team-record 15 strikeouts on May 15 against Sacramento at Chickasaw Bricktown Ballpark and went on to be named the PCL Pitcher of the Year.

The Dodgers recorded back-to-back-to-back home runs for the first time in modern team history (since 1998) June 9, 2017, against Round Rock in Oklahoma City. With one out in the first inning, Joc Pederson, Scott Van Slyke, and Willie Calhoun each homered within a span of five pitches.

The third-largest crowd in Chickasaw Bricktown Ballpark history was on hand to watch a rehab appearance by Los Angeles Dodgers pitcher Clayton Kershaw August 26, 2017, against the Omaha Storm Chasers. A standing-room-only crowd of 13,106 was the largest in OKC since April 18, 1998 – the third game ever played at Chickasaw Bricktown Ballpark.

The start of the 2020 season was postponed due to the COVID-19 pandemic before ultimately being canceled on June 30. In conjunction with Major League Baseball's restructuring of Minor League Baseball in 2021, the Dodgers were organized into the Triple-A West. Oklahoma City ended the season tied for second place in the Eastern Division with a 61–58 record. No playoffs were held to determine a league champion; instead, the team with the best regular-season record was declared the winner. However, 10 games that had been postponed from the start of the season were reinserted into the schedule as a postseason tournament called the Triple-A Final Stretch in which all 30 Triple-A clubs competed for the highest winning percentage. Oklahoma City finished the tournament tied for seventh place with a 6–4 record.

Following the 2021 season, on December 14, 2021, the Oklahoma City Dodgers were purchased by Diamond Baseball Holdings, a subsidiary of Endeavor Group Holdings, Inc. With the Los Angeles Dodgers remaining a parent club affiliate. In 2022, the Triple-A West became known as the Pacific Coast League, the name historically used by the regional circuit prior to the 2021 reorganization.

Season-by-season records

Notable players

Jim Acker, pitcher
Eddy Alvarez, second baseman
Cody Bellinger, outfielder/first baseman
Hank Blalock, third baseman/first baseman
Steve Buechele, third baseman
Marlon Byrd, outfielder
Walker Buehler, pitcher
Francisco Cordero, pitcher
Carl Crawford, left fielder
Nelson Cruz, outfielder
Chris Davis, first baseman
Doug Davis, pitcher
R. A. Dickey, pitcher
Justin Duchscherer, pitcher
Scott Feldman, pitcher
Neftalí Feliz, pitcher
Adrián González, first baseman
Juan González, outfielder/designated hitter
Travis Hafner, first baseman/designated hitter
Matt Harrison, pitcher
Gabe Kapler, outfielder
Dallas Keuchel, pitcher
Ian Kinsler, second baseman
Danny Kolb, pitcher
Duane Kuiper, second baseman
Gerald Laird, catcher
Zach Lee, starting pitcher
Ryan Ludwick, outfielder
Rick Manning, center fielder
J.D. Martinez, outfielder
Mitch Moreland, first baseman/outfielder
Max Muncy, third baseman
Jeff Newman, catcher
Alexi Ogando, pitcher
Carlos Peña, first baseman
J.R. Richard, starting pitcher
Jarrod Saltalamacchia, catcher
Ryne Sandberg, second baseman
Corey Seager, shortstop
Rubén Sierra, outfielder
Justin Smoak, first baseman
Sammy Sosa, outfielder
George Springer, outfielder
Edinson Vólquez, pitcher
C.J. Wilson, pitcher
Michael Young, infielder
Josh Zeid, pitcher

Radio and broadcasters
The Oklahoma City Dodgers broadcast all their games on the radio on KGHM (AM) 1340 The Game and television live on MiLB.TV, for the 2018 season only, some select games were broadcast locally on YurView Oklahoma on Cox Cable Oklahoma channel 703 and simulcasted on Cox digital HD channels 1333 or 1334 (in case of scheduling conflicts with local high school football) starting in June 2018 against the Salt Lake Bees on June 15, 2018, featuring main radio broadcaster and voice of the OKC Dodgers Alex Freedman via radio play-by-play simulcast. 

The current main radio voice for the Oklahoma City Dodgers is Alex Freedman (early 2012-present). Freedman started out as color commentator alongside then OKC Dodgers radio voice J.P. Shadrick at the start of the 2012 season (At start of first homestead of the season) but took over the main broadcast position (At start of first road trip of the season.) after Shadrick stepped down to take a job with the NFL's Jacksonville Jaguars. Fill-in broadcaster(s) (when Alex Freedman is absent) is or was KGHM (AM) 1340 The Game/News-radio 1000 KTOK-AM sports director Randy Renner.

The team has had multiple radio play-by-play broadcasters over the years, some of whom have advanced to the major league level.

Curt Gowdy (late 1940s): worked as a broadcaster for the New York Yankees, Boston Red Sox, MLB on NBC, and MLB on CBS Radio; Ford C. Frick Award winner
Bob Murphy (1949–1952): later broadcast for the Boston Red Sox, Baltimore Orioles, New York Mets, MLB on CBS Radio, and The Baseball Network; Ford C. Frick Award winner
Dewayne Staats (1973–1974): later worked for the Houston Astros, Chicago Cubs, New York Yankees, The Baseball Network, MLB on ESPN, Tampa Bay Rays, and MLB on Fox
Mike Nail (1975–1979): He later became the voice of the Arkansas Razorbacks basketball team under coaches Eddie Sutton and Nolan Richardson
John Rooney (1980–82): later worked for MLB on CBS Radio, Minnesota Twins, Chicago White Sox, The Baseball Network, MLB on Fox, MLB on ESPN Radio, and the St. Louis Cardinals.
Brian Barnhart (1989–94): broadcaster for the Los Angeles Angels of Anaheim, also served as an alternate broadcaster for the Oklahoma City Blazers hockey team (1992-1993)
Joe Simpson (1985): worked for the Seattle Mariners, Atlanta Braves, TBS Superstation, and MLB on TBS
Jack Damrill (1995–1999): Left to work as a weekend sports anchor for Oklahoma City NBC affiliate KFOR-TV News Channel 4, and also worked for the University of Oklahoma broadcasting both the baseball and women's basketball teams. Later worked as a radio voice for the Oklahoma City Energy FC of the USL for their inaugural season in 2014 only. Now works in media relations as a spokesman for the Oklahoma Turnpike Authority.  
Jim Byers (1998 as color commentator; July 1999–2002 and 2004–2010 as main broadcaster): Left the Redhawks in 2003 to host a local sports talk show on KREF-1400 AM in Norman, Oklahoma but returned to the team in 2004. He also worked as an announcer for Remington Park, a horse racing track in Oklahoma City from (1988–early 1999), and served as a fill-in then later became a full time voice for the Oklahoma City Blazers (2005–2009), and has also worked for the Tulsa Oilers (1996–1999), the Wichita Thunder (early 2003 as a fill-in voice for road games only), the University of Oklahoma as broadcaster for the university's women's basketball (2001-2002) and men's baseball teams (2003-early 2004), and was the voice for the American Hockey League’s Oklahoma City Barons from 2010 to 2015, when the franchise ceased operations and relocated to Bakersfield to become the Bakersfield Condors. In the fall of 2015 only, Byers was cohost of Friday Night Finals, a weekly local High School Football highlight show aired on KGHM (AM) 1340 or sister station KTOK-AM showcasing game scores and results from around the state during the High School football season. Byers also worked as a linesman in the Central Hockey League from 1992-1995. Byers currently works for Lone Star Park in the Dallas-Fort Worth metropolis as their track announcer (2015–present).
Dave Garrett (2003): Former radio voice for the Dallas Cowboys (1995–1998 including Super Bowl XXX) and New Orleans Saints (1992–1993) of the NFL, from 1986 to 1987 was sports director at WKY-AM and from 1987 to 1992 was sports talk host on sister station KTOK-AM both in Oklahoma City, and was a fill-in play-by-play broadcaster of Oklahoma State Cowboys football games and also did spot play-by-play for Oklahoma State Basketball, and worked high school championships and all-star games and Oklahoma football games on the Oklahoma News Network. He later worked for Oral Roberts University as voice for both the men's and women's basketball teams (1999–2004). In late 2003 Garrett was asked not to return to the Redhawks for the 2004 season in favor of bringing back former broadcaster Jim Byers. Garrett took a job with KREF-1400 AM from 2004 to 2005 (in a bit of a so-called job swap with Jim Byers). In 2006 he returned to his old job as sports director at KTOK-AM and its new sister station KGHM (AM) 1340 The Game from 2006 to 2012, prior to that in the Fall of 2005 he was cohost of Friday Night Finals, a weekly local High School Football highlight show aired on KGHM (AM) 1340 or sister station KTOK-AM showcasing game scores and results from around the state during the High School football season. He also hosted a weekday afternoon sports show on 1340 The Game before briefly ending the show for a few months to focus on his duties as station sports director before returning the show and hosting it until he was laid off as part of nationwide layoffs at Clear Channel Communications. He also hosted a local show called "DG on the Radio" on KRXO-107.7 FM (2013–2018) and was the play-by-play announcer for Westwood One radio coverage of the National Football League through 2001. Garrett currently serves as the voice of the University of Central Oklahoma Bronchos football and men's and women's basketball teams (2007–present).
J.P. Shadrick (2011–early April 2012): Was the Play-by-play voice of the Jacksonville Suns Baseball team. In early April 2012, Shadrick left the RedHawks after the first homestead of the 2012 season to take a job with the Jacksonville Jaguars. Currently, Shadrick is part of the broadcast team for the Jacksonville Jaguars of the NFL as host of pregame and postgame shows, occasional sideline reporter, and one of the hosts of the Jaguars weekly highlight show.

Roster

See also

 Oklahoma City Dodgers players (2015–present)
 Oklahoma City RedHawks players (2009–2014)
 Oklahoma RedHawks players (1998–2008)
 Oklahoma 89ers players (1962–1997)

References

External links

 

 
1962 establishments in Oklahoma
American Association (1902–1997) teams
Houston Astros minor league affiliates
Los Angeles Dodgers minor league affiliates
Pacific Coast League teams
Professional baseball teams in Oklahoma
Philadelphia Phillies minor league affiliates
Baseball teams established in 1962
Sports in Oklahoma City
Texas Rangers minor league affiliates
Cleveland Guardians minor league affiliates
Triple-A West teams